The following is a timeline of the history of the city of Radom, Poland.

Middle Ages

 1155: first mention about Radom (Pope Adrian IV bull)
 before 1300: Old Radom granted with Środa Śląska rights (city rights based on those of Środa Śląska)
 1233: first written reference to Radom's chief of castle - Marek
 1340: Casimir III founds New Radom (Nowy Radom)
 1360–1370: Casimir III founds St. John's Church
 1364: Radom granted with Magdeburg law
 1383: Jadwiga of Poland accepted by a Sejm held in Radom as a king of Poland
 1401: First union of Poland and Grand Duchy of Lithuania signed in Radom
 1481: Radom becomes a de facto capital of Poland after Casimir IV of Poland moves to Lithuania and his son, Saint Casimir to be, ruled the country in his absence from Radom
 1489: Grand Master of the Teutonic Order, John von Tieffen pays tribute to Casimir IV of Poland in Radom castle

Modern period
 1505: a Sejm in Radom passes the Nihil novi constitution and Łaski's Statute, the first real bill of rights of Poland
 1564: 1800 inhabitants, 180 houses, 14 butchers' shops, two baths and two wells
 1613: Radom becomes the place where the Highest Fiscal Courts are held
 1628: Great fire destroys the town
 1656: Charles X of Sweden stays in town during The Deluge
 1660: the city plundered by Sweden; after they leave the town has 395 inhabitants and 37 houses
 1724: Augustus II the Strong grant to Radom privilege De non tollerandis judaeis
 1737–1756: Kolegium Pijarów [the Piarists College] school founded
 1763: Fiscal Tribunal moved to Warsaw; the town has 1370 inhabitants and 137 buildings
 1795: After the 3rd Partition Radom is annexed by Austria

 1809: Radom becomes capital of a department of the Duchy of Warsaw
 1815: Radom, after the Congress of Vienna, becomes part of Russian-controlled Congress Poland
 1817: First lay school founded
 1819: Fryderyk August Schnierstein opens a tannery, the date is considered a start of towns industrialisation
 1844: Radom becomes the capital of Radom-Kielce government
 1846: Saint Casimir hospital founded.
 1867: Creation of Radom local government; the sewers are built
 1885: Dęblin–Dąbrowa Górnicza railway opened
 1901: electricity plant opened
 1906: Notable Polish independence fighter Kazimierz Sosnkowski, and future Polish politician and general, escaped from Warsaw to Radom, pursued by the Russian Okhrana, and became the commander of the local Polish Combat Organization.

 1908: Population: 39,981.
 1910: Radomiak Radom football club founded.
 1911: Radom has 51,934 inhabitants
 1920–1939: Radom becomes a part of the Central Industrial Area (Centralny Okręg Przemysłowy); Chemical Plant, arms and munitions factory (Łucznik Arms Factory), gas works, telephone and shoe factories are founded
 1921
 Czarni Radom football club (future multi-sport club) founded.
 State Railway Technical School moved from Skarżysko-Kamienna to Radom.
 1922: 72nd Infantry Regiment of the Polish Army stationed in Radom.
 1926: Broń Radom football club founded.
 1935: Radom–Warsaw railway opened. It significantly shortened rail distance between Warsaw and Kraków
 1938: 90,059 inhabitants

World War II
 1939
 German invasion of Poland, Radom occupied and made the capital of the Radom District of the General Government 
 September 21: German Einsatzgruppe II entered the city to commit various crimes against the population.
 September: The Germans closed down the local technical high school and established a hospital for wounded Polish and later German soldiers in its place.
 October 24: The Germans carried out a public execution of 24 Poles.
 November 5: The Germans carried out a public execution of 5 Poles.
 December 2: The Germans carried out a public execution of 19 Poles.
 December 14: The Germans carried out a public execution of 24 Poles.
 December 15: The Germans carried out a public execution of 13 Poles.
 December 19: The Germans carried out a public execution of 16 Poles.

 1940
 January 12: The Germans carried out a public execution of 10 Polish men.
 March: Polish Rada Główna Opiekuńcza organization established a kitchen at the railway station that prepared meals for the most needy.
 March 29: The Germans carried out an execution of 69 Poles from Stefanków in the Firlej district.
 March 31: The German gendarmerie carried out an execution of 43 Polish farmers, craftsmen and forest workers from Gałki in the Firlej district.
 April–May: Around 100 Poles from Radom were murdered by the Russians in the large Katyn massacre.
 May 16 and 24: The Germans carried out executions of 98 Poles, including teenagers, in the Firlej district.
 July 10 and 15: Deportations of Poles from the local prison to the Auschwitz concentration camp.
 August 20: Deportation of Poles from the local prison to the Auschwitz concentration camp.
 October 16: The Germans established a forced labour camp for Jews.
 November 9: Deportation of Poles from the local prison to the Auschwitz concentration camp.

 1941
 January: First German execution in the present-day Kosów district.
 April: Radom Ghetto established.
 1942
 September: The Germans discovered secret activity of the Polish resistance movement at the local arms factory and carried out mass arrests of its members.
 October 12–15: The Germans carried out three mass public executions of 50 Poles, including 26 employees of the arms factory, and a pregnant woman.
 April 23, 1943: Polish resistance successfully assassinated the chief of the local German police.
 1944
 March 1: The Germans carried out an execution of 36 Poles.
 July: Radom Ghetto dissolved.
 July: Partial evacuation of the German administration to Częstochowa.
 Deportations of Poles the Dulag 121 camp in Pruszków to Radom, following the Polish Warsaw Uprising. 3,500 Poles expelled from Warsaw stayed in the city, as of November 1, 1944.
 1945:
 January 14: Last transport of prisoners sent from to Radom to Auschwitz, it only reached Częstochowa.
 January 14: Last German execution in Firlej.
 January 16: liberation from German occupation
 January: The Soviet NKVD took over the former Gestapo headquarters.

Contemporary history

 September 9, 1945: Polish partisans attacked the communist prison and liberated nearly 500 prisoners.
 1948–1975: Theatre (Teatr Dramatyczny) and an engineering school are opened.
 1957: Czarni Radom volleyball section founded.
 1958: Monument to Polish workers of the local arms factory who were murdered by the Germans during World War II was unveiled.
 1975: the city becomes the capital of Radom Voivodeship
 1976:
 June 25: Huge workers' strike against the communist regime; the city becomes one of the main centres of anti-communist opposition in Poland (see June 1976 protests)
 July 17: Beginning of court trials of anti-communist protesters, in which 25 people were sentenced to prison.
 1981: Monument was unveiled at the site of a German execution of 15 Poles on October 14, 1942.
 1984: City limits were greatly expanded by including several settlements as new districts, including Długojów Górny, Huta Józefowska, Janiszpol, Józefów, Kierzków, Kończyce, Krychnowice, Krzewień, Malczew, Mleczna, Nowa Wola Gołębiowska, Nowiny Malczewskie, Stara Wola Gołębiowska, Wincentów, Wólka Klwatecka.
 1996: Radomska Wyższa Szkoła Inżynierska promoted to the rank of a Kazimierz Pułaski Technical University of Radom (Politechnika Radomska)
 1999: Radom becomes the capital of Radom County of the Masovian Voivodeship
 2003: Rosa Radom basketball club founded.
 2007: Radom Chamber Orchestra founded.

See also
 List of years in Poland

References

Radom
Radom
Years in Poland